The 1963 All-East football team consists of American football players chosen by various selectors as the best players at each position among the Eastern colleges and universities during the 1963 NCAA University Division football season. 

The 1963 Navy Midshipmen football team was ranked No. 2 in the final AP and UPI polls. Navy's quarterback Roger Staubach won the 1963 Heisman Trophy and was named to the All-Eastern first team by both the AP and the UPI.

The 1963 Pittsburgh Panthers football team was ranked No. 3 in the final UPI poll (No. 4 in the AP poll) and placed three players on the first team: halfback Paul Martha; tackle Ernie Borghetti; and guard Ed Adamchik.

Backs  
 Roger Staubach, Navy (AP-1, UPI-1 [qb])
 Paul Martha, Pittsburgh (AP-1, UPI-1 [hb])
 Cosmo Iacavazzi, Princeton (AP-1, UPI-1 [fb])
 Mike Brown, Delaware (AP-1)
 Gary Wood, Cornell (AP-1)
 Ken Waldrop, Army (UPI-1)

Ends 
 Jim Whalen, Boston College (AP-1, UPI-1)
 John Parry, Brown (AP-1)
 Dick Bowers, Syracuse (UPI-1)

Tackles 
 Ernie Borghetti, Pittsburgh (AP-1, UPI-1)
 Gerry Philbin, Buffalo (AP-1)
 Jim Freeman, Navy (UPI-1)

Guards 
 Dick Nowak, Army (AP-1, UPI-1)
 Glenn Ressler, Penn State (AP-1)
 Ed Adamchik, Pittsburgh (UPI-1)

Center 
 Jon Morris, Holy Cross (AP-1, UPI-1)

Key
 AP = Associated Press
 UPI = United Press International

See also
 1963 College Football All-America Team

References

All-Eastern
All-Eastern college football teams